William R. Lloyd Jr. (born October 30, 1947) is the Small Business Advocate for the State of Pennsylvania. He was a member of the Pennsylvania House of Representatives. He was the Democratic nominee for U.S. Senator against incumbent Arlen Specter in 1998.

References

Democratic Party members of the Pennsylvania House of Representatives
Living people
1947 births